The Charleston Chasers was a studio recording ensemble that recorded music on Columbia Records between 1925 and 1931. They recorded early versions of songs such as "After You've Gone", "Ain't Misbehavin'", and "My Melancholy Baby". Their 1931 recording of "Basin Street Blues" featured Benny Goodman, who stated that it was the first time that he was able to show his own musical personality on record.

The group's rendition of "Someday Sweetheart" was featured on the soundtrack of the Depression-era crime drama Road to Perdition.

Associated artists
 Vic Berton, drummer
 Jimmy Dorsey, clarinet
 Roy Evans, vocals
 Benny Goodman, clarinet
 Scrappy Lambert, vocals
 Dick McDonough, banjo or guitar
 Glenn Miller, trombone
 Miff Mole, trombone
 Phil Napoleon, trumpet
 Red Nichols, cornet
 Pee Wee Russell, clarinet
 Arthur Schutt, piano
 Paul Small, vocals
 Kate Smith, vocals
 Joe Tarto, tuba
 Eva Taylor, vocals
 Charlie Teagarden, trumpet
 Jack Teagarden, trombone

References

External links
The Charleston Chasers Red Hot Jazz Archive

American jazz ensembles
Columbia Records artists